Lothar König (1906-1946) was a German Jesuit priest and member of the Kreisau Circle of the German Resistance during the Nazi period. Though multi-denominational, the Kreisau group's opposition to the Hitler regime had a strongly Christian orientation, and looked for a general Christian revival, and reawakening of awareness of the transcendental. Its outlook was rooted both in German romantic and idealist tradition and in the Catholic doctrine of natural law. König would become an important intermediary between the Circle and bishops Grober of Freiberg and Preysing of Berlin. After the failure of the 1944 July Plot to assassinate Hitler, König was pursued by the Gestapo and sought refuge in a coal cellar, where he lived in hiding until the end of the war. König died shortly after the war from the effects of his time in hiding.

See also

Catholic Church and Nazi Germany
Kirchenkampf

References

Roman Catholics in the German Resistance
German resistance members
1906 births
1946 deaths
20th-century German Roman Catholic priests